Suomusjärvi is a former municipality of Finland. It was consolidated with Salo on January 1, 2009.

It is located in the province of Western Finland and is part of the Southwest Finland region. The municipality had a population of 1,321 (December 31, 2004) and covered an area of 176.53 km² of which 16.38 km² is water. The population density was 8.25 inhabitants per km². Its administrative center is Kitula.

The municipality was unilingually Finnish.

History 
Suomusjärvi was first mentioned in 1540, when it was a part of the parish of Kisko. It got its own chapel community in 1678. The chapel community was also known as Laidike as the church of the community was located in the village of Laidike. A new church was built in the village of Suomusjärvi in 1703, but the parish was still called Laidike in 1722. Suomusjärvi became an independent parish in 1898.

Suomusjärvi was consolidated with Salo in 2009.

References

External links

http://www.suomusjarvi.fi/ – Official website 

Former municipalities of Finland
Salo, Finland
Populated places disestablished in 2009
2009 disestablishments in Finland